Hunger Ward is a 2020 American documentary film directed by Skye Fitzgerald. It depicts the effects of the ongoing Yemeni famine on people, particularly children. It is the third film in Fitzgerald's "refugee trilogy", which also includes 50 Feet From Syria and Lifeboat.

Summary
Fueled by years of war that seems to be forgotten by the international community, the people of Yemen suffer as they sit on the brink of an unfathomable famine and humanitarian catastrophe. With unprecedented access, Oscar-nominated director Skye Fitzgerald takes us into the heart of two of the most active therapeutic feeding centers in Yemen. Here, two healthcare workers, Dr. Aida Alsadeeq and nurse Mekkia Mahdi, provide care to malnourished and hunger-stricken children in the throes of need. The third film in Fitzgerald’s refugee trilogy, Hunger Ward challenges us to absorb this heart-wrenching and intimate portrait of the bravery and courage required in the face of deep human suffering. The result is a work that paints the true realities of war — which is so often unseen and overlooked — and asks us to not look away.

Reception
Hunger Ward was nominated for the Academy Award for Best Documentary Short Subject at the 93rd Academy Awards in 2021. 
Rotten Tomatoes gave the film a rating of 100% based on reviews from 5 critics.

References

External links
 Hunger Ward on Pluto TV
 Hunger Ward on Paramount+
 
 Official website

2020 films
2020 short documentary films
American documentary films
Documentary films about children in war
Documentary films about health care
Documentary films about human rights
Documentary films about Yemen
Yemeni Civil War (2014–present)
2020s English-language films
2020s American films